The Arabic script is the writing system used for Arabic and several other languages of Asia and Africa. It is the second-most widely used writing system in the world by number of countries using it or a script directly derived from it, and the third-most by number of users (after the Latin and Chinese scripts).

The script was first used to write texts in Arabic, most notably the Quran, the holy book of Islam. With the religion's spread, it came to be used as the primary script for many language families, leading to the addition of new letters and other symbols. Such languages still using it are: Persian (Farsi/Dari), Malay (Jawi), Uyghur, Kurdish, Punjabi (Shahmukhi), Sindhi, Balti, Balochi, Pashto, Lurish, Urdu, Kashmiri, Rohingya, Somali and Mandinka, Mooré among others. Until the 16th century, it was also used for some Spanish texts, and—prior to the language reform in 1928—it was the writing system of Turkish.

The script is written from right to left in a cursive style, in which most of the letters are written in slightly different forms according to whether they stand alone or are joined to a following or preceding letter. However, the basic letter form remains unchanged. The script does not have capital letters. In most cases, the letters transcribe consonants, or consonants and a few vowels, so most Arabic alphabets are abjads, with the versions used for some languages, such as Sorani, Uyghur, Mandarin, and Serbo-Croatian, being alphabets. It is also the basis for the tradition of Arabic calligraphy.

History 

The Arabic alphabet is derived either from the Nabataean alphabet or (less widely believed) directly from the Syriac alphabet, which are both derived from the Aramaic alphabet (which also gave rise to the Hebrew alphabet), which, in turn, descended from the Phoenician alphabet.  In addition to the Aramaic script (and, therefore, the Arabic and Hebrew scripts), the Phoenician script also gave rise to the Greek alphabet (and, therefore, both the Cyrillic alphabet and the Latin alphabet used to write this article).

Origins 
In the 6th and 5th centuries BCE, northern Arab tribes emigrated and founded a kingdom centred around Petra, Jordan. These people (now named Nabataeans from the name of one of the tribes, Nabatu) spoke Nabataean Arabic, a dialect of the Arabic language. In the 2nd or 1st centuries BCE, the first known records of the Nabataean alphabet were written in the Aramaic language (which was the language of communication and trade), but included some Arabic language features: the Nabataeans did not write the language which they spoke. They wrote in a form of the Aramaic alphabet, which continued to evolve; it separated into two forms: one intended for inscriptions (known as "monumental Nabataean") and the other, more cursive and hurriedly written and with joined letters, for writing on papyrus. This cursive form influenced the monumental form more and more and gradually changed into the Arabic alphabet.

Overview 

The Arabic script has been adapted for use in a wide variety of languages besides Arabic, including Persian, Malay and Urdu, which are not Semitic. Such adaptations may feature altered or new characters to represent phonemes that do not appear in Arabic phonology. For example, the Arabic language lacks a voiceless bilabial plosive (the  sound), therefore many languages add their own letter to represent  in the script, though the specific letter used varies from language to language. These modifications tend to fall into groups: Indian and Turkic languages written in the Arabic script tend to use the Persian modified letters, whereas the languages of Indonesia tend to imitate those of Jawi. The modified version of the Arabic script originally devised for use with Persian is known as the Perso-Arabic script by scholars.

When the Arabic script is used to write Serbo-Croatian, Sorani, Kashmiri, Mandarin Chinese, or Uyghur, vowels are mandatory. The Arabic script can, therefore, be used as a true alphabet as well as an abjad, although it is often strongly, if erroneously, connected to the latter due to it being originally used only for Arabic.

Use of the Arabic script in West African languages, especially in the Sahel, developed with the spread of Islam. To a certain degree the style and usage tends to follow those of the Maghreb (for instance the position of the dots in the letters  and ). Additional diacritics have come into use to facilitate the writing of sounds not represented in the Arabic language. The term , which comes from the Arabic root for "foreign," has been applied to Arabic-based orthographies of African languages.

Table of writing styles

Table of alphabets

Current use
Today Iran, Afghanistan, Pakistan, India, and China are the main non-Arabic speaking states using the Arabic alphabet to write one or more official national languages, including Azerbaijani, Baluchi, Brahui, Persian, Pashto, Central Kurdish, Urdu, Sindhi, Kashmiri, Punjabi and Uyghur.

An Arabic alphabet is currently used for the following languages:

Middle East and Central Asia

 Arabic
 Garshuni (or Karshuni) originated in the 7th century, when Arabic became the dominant spoken language in the Fertile Crescent, but Arabic script was not yet fully developed or widely read, and so the Syriac alphabet was used. There is evidence that writing Arabic in this other set of letters (known as Garshuni) influenced the style of modern Arabic script. After this initial period, Garshuni writing has continued to the present day among some Syriac Christian communities in the Arabic-speaking regions of the Levant and Mesopotamia.
 Kazakh in Kazakhstan, China, Iran and Afghanistan
 Kurdish in Northern Iraq and Northwest Iran.  (In Turkey and Syria the Latin script is used for Kurdish)
 Kyrgyz by its 150,000 speakers in the Xinjiang Uyghur Autonomous Region in northwestern China, Pakistan, Kyrgyzstan and Afghanistan
 Turkmen in Turkmenistan, Afghanistan and Iran
 Uzbek in Uzbekistan and Afghanistan
 Persian in Iranian Persian and Dari in Afghanistan. It had former use in Tajikistan but is no longer used in Standard Tajik
 Baluchi in Iran, in Pakistan's Balochistan region, Afghanistan and Oman
 Southwestern Iranian languages as Lori dialects and Bakhtiari language
 Pashto in Afghanistan and Pakistan, and Tajikistan
 Uyghur changed to Latin script in 1969 and back to a simplified, fully voweled Arabic script in 1983
 Judeo-Arabic languages
 Judeo-Tunisian Arabic
 Azerbaijani language in Iran
 Talysh language in Iran
 Mazanderani language in Iran
 Shughni language in Afghanistan

East Asia
 The Chinese language is written by some Hui in the Arabic-derived Xiao'erjing alphabet (see also Sini (script))
 The Turkic Salar language is written by some Salar in the Arabic alphabet
 Uyghur alphabet

South Asia
Balochi in Pakistan and Iran
 Dari in Afghanistan
 Kashmiri in India and Pakistan (also written in Sharada and Devanagari  although Kashmiri is more commonly written in Perso-Arabic Script)
 Pashto in Afghanistan and Pakistan
 Khowar in Northern Pakistan, also uses the Latin script
 Punjabi (Shahmukhi) in Pakistan, also written in the Brahmic script known as Gurmukhi in India
 Saraiki, written with a modified Arabic script - that has 45 letters
 Sindhi, a British commissioner in Sindh on August 29, 1857, ordered to change Arabic script, also written in Devanagari in India
 Aer language
 Bhadrawahi language
 Ladakhi (India), although it is more commonly written using the Tibetan script
Balti (a Sino-Tibetan language), also rarely written in the Tibetan script
 Brahui language in Pakistan and Afghanistan
 Burushaski or Burusho language, a language isolated to Pakistan.
 Urdu in Pakistan (and historically several other Hindustani languages). Urdu is one of several official languages in the states of Jammu and Kashmir, Delhi, Uttar Pradesh, Bihar, Jharkhand, West Bengal and Telangana.
 Dogri, spoken by about five million people in India and Pakistan, chiefly in the Jammu region of Jammu and Kashmir and in Himachal Pradesh, but also in northern Punjab, although Dogri is more commonly written in Devanagari
Arwi language (a mixture of Arabic and Tamil) uses the Arabic script together with the addition of 13 letters. It is mainly used in Sri Lanka and the South Indian state of Tamil Nadu for religious purposes. Arwi language is the language of Tamil Muslims
Arabi Malayalam is Malayalam written in the Arabic script. The script has particular letters to represent the peculiar sounds of Malayalam. This script is mainly used in madrasas of the South Indian state of Kerala and of Lakshadweep.
 Rohingya language (Ruáingga) is a language spoken by the Rohingya people of Rakhine State, formerly known as Arakan (Rakhine), Burma (Myanmar). It is similar to Chittagonian language in neighboring Bangladesh and sometimes written using the Roman script, or an Arabic-derived script known as Hanifi
 Ishkashimi language (Ishkashimi) in Afghanistan

Southeast Asia
 Malay in the Arabic script known as Jawi. In some cases it can be seen in the signboards of shops and market stalls. Particularly in Brunei, Jawi is used in terms of writing or reading for Islamic religious educational programs in primary school, secondary school, college, or even higher educational institutes such as universities. In addition, some television programming uses Jawi, such as announcements, advertisements, news, social programs or Islamic programs
 co-official in Brunei
 Malaysia but co-official in Kelantan and Kedah, Islamic states in Malaysia
 Indonesia, Jawi script is co-used with Latin in provinces of Aceh, Riau, Riau Islands and Jambi. The Javanese, Madurese and Sundanese also use another Arabic variant, the Pegon in Islamic writings and pesantren community.
 Southern Thailand
 Predominantly Muslim areas of the Philippines (especially Tausug language)
 Ida'an language (also Idahan) a Malayo-Polynesian language spoken by the Ida'an people of Sabah, Malaysia
 Cham language in Cambodia besides Western Cham script.

Africa
 North Africa
Arabic
 Berber languages have often been written in an adaptation of the Arabic alphabet. The use of the Arabic alphabet, as well as the competing Latin and Tifinagh scripts, has political connotations
 Tuareg language, (sometimes called Tamasheq) which is also a Berber language
 Coptic language of Egyptians as Coptic text written in Arabic letters
 Northeast Africa
Bedawi or Beja, mainly in northeastern Sudan
 Wadaad writing, used in Somalia
 Nubian languages
Dongolawi language or Andaandi language of Nubia, in the Nile Vale of northern Sudan
 Nobiin language, the largest Nubian language (previously known by the geographic terms Mahas and Fadicca/Fiadicca) is not yet standardized, being written variously in both Latinized and Arabic scripts; also, there have been recent efforts to revive the Old Nubian alphabet.
 Fur language of Darfur, Sudan
 Southeast Africa
Comorian, in the Comoros, currently side by side with the Latin alphabet (neither is official)
 Swahili, was originally written in Arabic alphabet, Swahili orthography is now based on the Latin alphabet that was introduced by Christian missionaries and colonial administrators
 West Africa
Zarma language of the Songhay family. It is the language of the southwestern lobe of the West African nation of Niger, and it is the second leading language of Niger, after Hausa, which is spoken in south central Niger
 Tadaksahak is a Songhay language spoken by the pastoralist Idaksahak of the Ménaka area of Mali
 Hausa language uses an adaptation of the Arabic script known as Ajami, for many purposes, especially religious, but including newspapers, mass mobilization posters and public information
 Dyula language is a Mandé language spoken in Burkina Faso, Côte d'Ivoire and Mali.
 Jola-Fonyi language of the Casamance region of Senegal
 Balanta language a Bak language of west Africa spoken by the Balanta people and Balanta-Ganja dialect in Senegal
 Mandinka, widely but unofficially (known as Ajami), (another non-Latin script used is the N'Ko script)
 Fula, especially the Pular of Guinea (known as Ajami)
 Wolof (at zaouia schools), known as Wolofal.
 Arabic script outside Africa
 In writings of African American slaves
 Writings of by Omar Ibn Said (1770–1864) of Senegal
 The Bilali Document also known as Bilali Muhammad Document is a handwritten, Arabic manuscript on West African Islamic law. It was written by Bilali Mohammet in the 19th century. The document is currently housed in the library at the University of Georgia
 Letter written by Ayuba Suleiman Diallo (1701–1773)
 Arabic Text From 1768
 Letter written by Abdul Rahman Ibrahima Sori (1762–1829)

Former use 
With the establishment of Muslim rule in the subcontinent, one or more forms of the Arabic script were incorporated among the assortment of scripts used for writing native languages. In the 20th century, the Arabic script was generally replaced by the Latin alphabet in the Balkans, parts of Sub-Saharan Africa, and Southeast Asia, while in the Soviet Union, after a brief period of Latinisation, use of Cyrillic was mandated. Turkey changed to the Latin alphabet in 1928 as part of an internal Westernizing revolution. After the collapse of the Soviet Union in 1991, many of the Turkic languages of the ex-USSR attempted to follow Turkey's lead and convert to a Turkish-style Latin alphabet. However, renewed use of the Arabic alphabet has occurred to a limited extent in Tajikistan, whose language's close resemblance to Persian allows direct use of publications from Afghanistan and Iran.

Africa
 Afrikaans (as it was first written among the "Cape Malays", see Arabic Afrikaans)
 Berber in North Africa, particularly Shilha in Morocco (still being considered, along with Tifinagh and Latin, for Central Atlas Tamazight)
 French by the Arabs and Berbers in Algeria and other parts of North Africa during the French colonial period
 Harari, by the Harari people of the Harari Region in Ethiopia. Now uses the Geʻez and Latin alphabets
 For the West African languages—Hausa, Fula, Mandinka, Wolof and some more—the Latin alphabet has officially replaced Arabic transcriptions for use in literacy and education
 Kinyarwanda in Rwanda
 Kirundi in Burundi
 Malagasy in Madagascar (script known as Sorabe)
 Nubian
 Shona in Zimbabwe
 Somali (see wadaad Arabic) has mostly used the Latin alphabet since 1972
 Songhay in West Africa, particularly in Timbuktu
 Swahili (has used the Latin alphabet since the 19th century)
 Yoruba in West Africa (this was probably limited, but still notable)

Europe
 Albanian called Elifbaja shqip
 Aljamiado (Mozarabic, Berber, Aragonese, Portuguese, Ladino, and Spanish, during and residually after the Muslim rule in the Iberian peninsula)
 Belarusian (among ethnic Tatars; see Belarusian Arabic alphabet)
 Bosnian (only for literary purposes; currently written in the Latin alphabet; Text example:  = Molimo se tebi, Bože (We pray to you, O God); see Arebica)
 Crimean Tatar
 Greek in certain areas in Greece and Anatolia. In particular, Cappadocian Greek written in Perso-Arabic
 Polish (among ethnic Lipka Tatars)

Central Asia and Caucasus
 Adyghe language also known as West Circassian, is an official languages of the Republic of Adygea in the Russian Federation. It used Arabic alphabet before 1927
 Avar as well as other languages of Daghestan: Nogai, Kumyk, Lezgian, Lak and Dargwa
 Azeri in Azerbaijan (now written in the Latin alphabet and Cyrillic script in Azerbaijan)
 Bashkir (officially for some years from the October Revolution of 1917 until 1928, changed to Latin, now uses the Cyrillic script)
 Chaghatay across Central Asia
 Chechen (sporadically from the adoption of Islam; officially from 1917 until 1928)
 Circassian and some other members of the Abkhaz–Adyghe family in the western Caucasus and sporadically – in the countries of Middle East, like Syria
 Ingush
 Karachay-Balkar in the central Caucasus
 Karakalpak
 Kazakh in Kazakhstan (until the 1930s, changed to Latin, currently using Cyrillic, phasing in Latin)
 Kyrgyz in Kyrgyzstan (until the 1930s, changed to Latin, now uses the Cyrillic script)
 Mandarin Chinese and Dungan, among the Hui people (script known as Xiao'erjing)
 Ottoman Turkish
 Tat in South-Eastern Caucasus
 Tatar before 1928 (changed to Latin Yañalif), reformed in the 1880s (İske imlâ), 1918 (Yaña imlâ – with the omission of some letters)
 Turkmen in Turkmenistan (changed to Latin in 1929, then to the Cyrillic script, then back to Latin in 1991)
 Uzbek in Uzbekistan (changed to Latin, then to the Cyrillic script, then back to Latin in 1991)
 Some Northeast Caucasian languages of the Muslim peoples of the USSR between 1918 and 1928 (many also earlier), including Chechen, Lak, etc. After 1928, their script became Latin, then later Cyrillic

South and Southeast Asia
 Acehnese in Sumatra, Indonesia
 Banjarese in Kalimantan, Indonesia
 Bengali in Bengal, Arabic scripts have been used historically in places like Chittagong and West Bengal among other places. See Dobhashi for further information.
 Maguindanaon in the Philippines
 Malay in Malaysia, Singapore and Indonesia. Although Malay speakers in Brunei and Southern Thailand still use the script on a daily basis
 Minangkabau in Sumatra, Indonesia
 Pegon script of Javanese, Madurese and Sundanese in Indonesia, used only in Islamic schools and institutions
 Tausug in the Philippines, Malaysia, and Indonesia it can be used in Islamic schools in the Philippines 
 Maranao in the Philippines
 Rakhine in Burma and Bangladesh
 Mongolian in Afghanistan There is also a language in the Mongolic family that spoken in the Afghanistan  it is called Mogholi language
 Tagalog in the Philippines
 Yakan in Basilan
 Aslian in Malaysia
 Ternate in Indonesia by the Muslims 
 Tidore in Indonesia
 Meitei in Bangladesh
 Shughni in Afghanistan
 Thai in Malaysia
 Sylheti in Arakan, Bengal, Chittagong, and Tripura
 Kedah Malay in Myanmar, Malaysia, and Thailand
 Uab Meto in Indonesia
 Molbog in Sabah used by the Muslims even though in Palawan
 Bonggi in Sabah by the Muslims
 Kadazan in Malaysia is a Muslim language
 Dusun used in Brunei, and Malaysia
 Sama used in Philippines, Malaysia, and Indonesia
 Bajau is in Philippines, Malaysia, and Indonesia
 Sarawak Bisaya used in Malaysia, and Brunei
 Sabah Bisaya is used in Sabah
 Lotud spoken in Malaysia only 
 Lun Bawang in Sarawak, Sabah, Temburong and Kalimantan
 Tiruray in the Bangsamoro
 Chavacano in Cotabato, Zamboanga Peninsula, Sulu, Basilan, Tawi-Tawi, Sabah, and Kalimantan
 Maranao has Arabic script in Lanao del Sur,Lanao del Norte, and Sabah
 Iranun used in Islamic schools in Mindanao,and Malaysia

Middle East
 Hebrew was written in Arabic letters in a number of places in the past
 Northern Kurdish in Turkey and Syria was written in Arabic script until 1932, when a modified Kurdish Latin alphabet was introduced by Jaladat Ali Badirkhan in Syria
 Turkish in the Ottoman Empire was written in Arabic script until Mustafa Kemal Atatürk declared the change to Latin script in 1928. This form of Turkish is now known as Ottoman Turkish and is held by many to be a different language, due to its much higher percentage of Persian and Arabic loanwords (Ottoman Turkish alphabet)

Unicode 

As of Unicode 15.0, the following ranges encode Arabic characters:

 Arabic (0600–06FF)
 Arabic Supplement (0750–077F)
 Arabic Extended-A (08A0–08FF)
 Arabic Extended-B (0870–089F)
 Arabic Extended-C (10EC0–10EFF)
 Arabic Presentation Forms-A (FB50–FDFF)
 Arabic Presentation Forms-B (FE70–FEFF)
 Arabic Mathematical Alphabetic Symbols (1EE00–1EEFF)
 Rumi Numeral Symbols (10E60–10E7F)
 Indic Siyaq Numbers (1EC70–1ECBF)
 Ottoman Siyaq Numbers (1ED00–1ED4F)

Additional letters used in other languages

Assignment of phonemes to graphemes 

  
{| class="wikitable sortable" style=text-align:center 
|+ Table of additional letters in other languages 
|- 
! rowspan=2 colspan=4 | Letter or Digraph  
! rowspan=2 class="nowrap" style="" | Use & Pronunciation 
! rowspan=1 |  Unicode 
! rowspan=1 colspan=4 | i'jam & other additions 
! rowspan=2 | Shape 
! rowspan=2 | Similar Arabic Letter(s) 
|- 
! U+ 
! 
!  
! above 
! below 
|-

|- 
| style="font-size:150%;" |  
| colspan=3 class="nowrap" style="font-size:140%;" |  
| style="text-align:left;font-size:95%;" | Pe, used to represent the phoneme  in Persian, Pashto, Punjabi, Khowar, Sindhi, Urdu, Kurdish, Kashmiri; it can be used in Arabic to describe the phoneme  otherwise it is normalized to  ب e.g. پول Paul also written بول 
| style="font-size:85%;" | U+067E 
| colspan=2 style="font-size:150%;" |  
| style=color:#E2E5EA; | none 
| 3 dots 
| style="font-size:150%;" |  
| style="font-size:150%;" |  
|- 
| style="font-size:150%;" |  
| colspan=3 class="nowrap" style="font-size:140%;" |  
| style="text-align:left;font-size:95%;" | used to represent the equivalent of the Latin letter Ƴ (palatalized glottal stop ) in some African languages such as Fulfulde. 
| style="font-size:85%;" | U+0750 
| colspan=2 class="nowrap" style="font-size:150%;" |    
| style=color:#E2E5EA; | none
| 3 dots  (horizontal) 
| style="font-size:150%;" |  
| style="font-size:150%;" |  
|- 
| style="font-size:150%;" |  
| colspan=3 class="nowrap" style="font-size:140%;" |  
| style="text-align:left;font-size:95%;" | B̤ē, used to represent a voiced bilabial implosive  in Hausa, Sindhi and Saraiki.
| style="font-size:85%;" | U+067B 
| colspan=2 style="font-size:150%;" |  
| style=color:#E2E5EA; | none
| 2 dots  (vertically) 
| style="font-size:150%;" |  
| style="font-size:150%;" |  
|- 
| style="font-size:150%;" |  
| colspan=3 class="nowrap" style="font-size:140%;" |  
| style="text-align:left;font-size:95%;" | represents an aspirated voiced bilabial plosive  in Sindhi.
| style="font-size:85%;" | U+0680 
| colspan=2 style="font-size:150%;" |  
| style=color:#E2E5EA; | none 
| 4 dots 
| style="font-size:150%;" |  
| style="font-size:150%;" |  
|- 
| style="font-size:150%;" |  
| colspan=3 class="nowrap" style="font-size:140%;" |  
| style="text-align:left;font-size:95%;" | Ṭhē, represents the aspirated voiceless retroflex plosive  in Sindhi.
| style="font-size:85%;" | U+067A 
| colspan=2 style="font-size:150%;" |  
| 2 dots  (vertically)
| style=color:#E2E5EA; | none 
| style="font-size:150%;" |  
| style="font-size:150%;" |  
|- 
| style="font-size:150%;" |  
| colspan=3 class="nowrap" style="font-size:140%;" |  
| style="text-align:left;font-size:95%;" | Ṭē, used to represent the phoneme  in Pashto.
| style="font-size:85%;" | U+067C 
| style="font-size:150%;" |  
| style="font-size:150%;" |  
| 2 dots 
| ring 
| style="font-size:150%;" |  
| style="font-size:150%;" |  
|- 
| style="font-size:150%;" |  
| colspan=3 class="nowrap" style="font-size:140%;" |  
| style="text-align:left;font-size:95%;" | Ṭe, used to represent the phoneme (a voiceless retroflex plosive ) in Sindhi
| style="font-size:85%;" | U+067D 
| colspan=2 style="font-size:150%;" |  
| 3 dots  (inverted) 
| style=color:#E2E5EA; | none
| style="font-size:150%;" |  
| style="font-size:150%;" |  
|- 
| style="font-size:150%;" |  
| colspan=3 class="nowrap" style="font-size:140%;" |  
| style="text-align:left;font-size:95%;" | Ṭe, used to represent Ṭ (a voiceless retroflex plosive ) in Punjabi, Kashmiri, Urdu.
| style="font-size:85%;" | U+0679 
| colspan=2 style="font-size:150%;" |  
| small  
| style=color:#E2E5EA; | none 
| style="font-size:150%;" |  
| style="font-size:150%;" |  
|- 
| style="font-size:150%;" |  
| colspan=3 class="nowrap" style="font-size:140%;" |  
| style="text-align:left;font-size:95%;" | Teheh, used in Sindhi and Rajasthani (when written in Sindhi alphabet); used to represent the phoneme  (pinyin q) in Chinese Xiao'erjing.
| style="font-size:85%;" | U+067F 
| colspan=2 style="font-size:150%;" |  
| 4 dots 
| style=color:#E2E5EA; | none
| style="font-size:150%;" |  
| style="font-size:150%;" |  
|- 
| style="font-size:150%;" | 
| colspan=3 class="nowrap" style="font-size:140%;" |  
| style="text-align:left;font-size:95%;" | represents the "c" voiceless dental affricate  phoneme in Bosnian.
| style="font-size:85%;" | U+0684 
| colspan=2 style="font-size:150%;" |  
| style=color:#E2E5EA; | none
| 2 dots  (vertically) 
| style="font-size:150%;" |  
| style="font-size:150%;" |  
|- 
| style="font-size:150%;" |  
| colspan=3 class="nowrap" style="font-size:140%;" |  
| style="text-align:left;font-size:95%;" | represents the "ć" voiceless alveolo-palatal affricate  phoneme in Bosnian.
| style="font-size:85%;" | U+0683 
| colspan=2 style="font-size:150%;" |  
| style=color:#E2E5EA; | none 
| 2 dots 
| style="font-size:150%;" |  
| style="font-size:150%;" |  
|- 
| style="font-size:150%;" |  
| colspan=3 class="nowrap" style="font-size:140%;" |  
| style="text-align:left;font-size:95%;" | Che, used to represent  ("ch"). It is used in Persian, Pashto, Punjabi, Urdu, Kashmiri and Kurdish.  in Egypt.
| style="font-size:85%;" | U+0686 
| colspan=2 style="font-size:150%;" |  
| style=color:#E2E5EA; | none 
| 3 dots 
| style="font-size:150%;" |  
| style="font-size:150%;" |  
|- 
| style="font-size:150%;" |  
| colspan=3 class="nowrap" style="font-size:140%;" |  
| style="text-align:left;font-size:95%;" | Ce, used to represent the phoneme  in Pashto.
| style="font-size:85%;" | U+0685 
| colspan=2 style="font-size:150%;" |  
| 3 dots 
| style=color:#E2E5EA; | none 
| style="font-size:150%;" |  
| style="font-size:150%;" |  
|- 
| style="font-size:150%;" |  
| colspan=3 class="nowrap" style="font-size:140%;" |  
| style="text-align:left;font-size:95%;" | represents the "đ" voiced alveolo-palatal affricate  phoneme in Bosnian.
| style="font-size:85%;" | U+0757 
| colspan=2 style="font-size:150%;" |  
| 2 dots 
| style=color:#E2E5EA; | none 
| style="font-size:150%;" |  
| style="font-size:150%;" |  
|- 
| style="font-size:150%;" |  
| colspan=3 class="nowrap" style="font-size:140%;" |  
| style="text-align:left;font-size:95%;" | Źim, used to represent the phoneme  in Pashto.
| style="font-size:85%;" | U+0681 
| colspan=2 style="font-size:150%;" | 
| Hamza 
| style=color:#E2E5EA; | none 
| style="font-size:150%;" |  
| style="font-size:150%;" |  
|- 
| style="font-size:150%;" |  
| colspan=3 class="nowrap" style="font-size:140%;" |  
| style="text-align:left;font-size:95%;" | used in Saraiki to represent a Voiced alveolar implosive .
| style="font-size:85%;" | U+0759 
| class="nowrap" style="font-size:150%;" |  
| class="nowrap" style="font-size:150%;" |  
| small  
| 2 dots  (vertically) 
| style="font-size:150%;" |  
| style="font-size:150%;" |  
|- 
| style="font-size:150%;" |  
| colspan=3 class="nowrap" style="font-size:140%;" | 

| style="text-align:left;font-size:95%;" | used in Saraiki to represent a voiced retroflex implosive .
| style="font-size:85%;" | U+068A 
| colspan=2 style="font-size:150%;" |  
| style=color:#E2E5EA; | none 
| 1 dot 
| style="font-size:150%;" |  
| style="font-size:150%;" |  
|- 
| style="font-size:150%;" |  
| colspan=3 class="nowrap" style="font-size:140%;" |  
| style="text-align:left;font-size:95%;" | Ḍal, used to represent a Ḍ (a voiced retroflex plosive ) in Punjabi, Kashmiri and Urdu.
| style="font-size:85%;" | U+0688 
| colspan=2 style="font-size:150%;" |  
| small  
| style=color:#E2E5EA; | none 
| style="font-size:150%;" |  
| style="font-size:150%;" |  
|- 
| style="font-size:150%;" |  
| colspan=3 class="nowrap" style="font-size:140%;" |  
| style="text-align:left;font-size:95%;" | Dhal, used to represent the phoneme  in Sindhi
| style="font-size:85%;" | U+068C 
| colspan=2 style="font-size:150%;" |  
| 2 dots 
| style=color:#E2E5EA; | none 
| style="font-size:150%;" |  
| style="font-size:150%;" |  
|- 
| style="font-size:150%;" | 
| colspan=3 class="nowrap" style="font-size:140%;" |  
| style="text-align:left;font-size:95%;" | Ḍal, used to represent the phoneme  in Pashto.
| style="font-size:85%;" | U+0689 
| colspan=2 style="font-size:150%;" |  
| style=color:#E2E5EA; | none 
| ring 
| style="font-size:150%;" |  
| style="font-size:150%;" |  
|- 
| style="font-size:150%;" | 
| colspan=3 class="nowrap" style="font-size:140%;" |  
| style="text-align:left;font-size:95%;" | Ṛe, represents a retroflex flap  in Punjabi and Urdu.
| style="font-size:85%;" | U+0691 
| colspan=2 style="font-size:150%;" |  
| small  
| style=color:#E2E5EA; | none 
| style="font-size:150%;" |  
| style="font-size:150%;" |  
|- 
| style="font-size:150%;" |  
| colspan=3 class="nowrap" style="font-size:140%;" |  
| style="text-align:left;font-size:95%;" | Ṛe, used to represent a retroflex lateral flap in Pashto.
| style="font-size:85%;" | U+0693 
| colspan=2 style="font-size:150%;" |  
| style=color:#E2E5EA; | none 
| ring 
| style="font-size:150%;" | 
| style="font-size:150%;" | 
|- 
| style="font-size:150%;" |  
| colspan=3 class="nowrap" style="font-size:140%;" |  
| style="text-align:left;font-size:95%;" | used in Ormuri to represent a voiced alveolo-palatal fricative , as well as in Torwali.
| style="font-size:85%;" | U+076B 
| colspan=2 style="font-size:150%;" |  
| 2 dots  (vertically) 
| style=color:#E2E5EA; | none 
| style="font-size:150%;" |  
| style="font-size:150%;" | 
|- 
| style="font-size:150%;" |  
| colspan=3 class="nowrap" style="font-size:140%;" |  
| style="text-align:left;font-size:95%;" | Že / zhe, used to represent the voiced postalveolar fricative  in, Persian, Pashto, Kurdish, Urdu, Punjabi and Uyghur.
| style="font-size:85%;" | U+0698 
| colspan=2 style="font-size:150%;" |  
| 3 dots 
| style=color:#E2E5EA; | none 
| style="font-size:150%;" |  
| style="font-size:150%;" |  
|- 
| style="font-size:150%;" |  
| colspan=3 class="nowrap" style="font-size:140%;" |  
| style="text-align:left;font-size:95%;" | Ǵe / ẓ̌e, used to represent the phoneme    in Pashto.
| style="font-size:85%;" | U+0696 
| style="font-size:150%;" |  
| style="font-size:150%;" |  
| 1 dot 
| 1 dot 
| style="font-size:150%;" |  
| style="font-size:150%;" |  
|- 
| style="font-size:150%;" |  
| colspan=3 class="nowrap" style="font-size:140%;" |  
| style="text-align:left;font-size:95%;" | used in Kurdish to represent rr  in Soranî dialect.
| style="font-size:85%;" | U+0695 
| colspan=2 style="font-size:150%;" |  
| style=color:#E2E5EA; | none
| V pointing down 
| style="font-size:150%;" |  
| style="font-size:150%;" |  
|- 
| style="font-size:150%;" |  
| colspan=3 class="nowrap" style="font-size:140%;" |  
| style="text-align:left;font-size:95%;" | used in Kalami to represent a voiceless retroflex fricative , and in Ormuri to represent a voiceless alveolo-palatal fricative /ɕ/.
| style="font-size:85%;" | U+076D 
| colspan=2 style="font-size:150%;" |  
| 2 dots vertically 
| style=color:#E2E5EA; | none 
| style="font-size:150%;" |  
| style="font-size:150%;" |  
|- 
| style="font-size:150%;" |  
| colspan=3 class="nowrap" style="font-size:140%;" |  
| style="text-align:left;font-size:95%;" | used in Shina to represent a voiceless retroflex fricative .
| style="font-size:85%;" | U+075C 
| colspan=2 style="font-size:150%;" |  
| 4 dots 
| style=color:#E2E5EA; | none 
| style="font-size:150%;" |  
| style="font-size:150%;" |  
|- 
| style="font-size:150%;" |  
| colspan=3 class="nowrap" style="font-size:140%;" | 
| style="text-align:left;font-size:95%;" | X̌īn / ṣ̌īn, used to represent the phoneme    in Pashto.
| style="font-size:85%;" | U+069A 
| style="font-size:150%;" |  
| style="font-size:150%;" |  
| 1 dot 
| 1 dot 
| style="font-size:150%;" |  
| style="font-size:150%;" |  
|- 
| style="font-size:150%;" |  
| colspan=3 class="nowrap" style="font-size:140%;" |  
| style="font-size:85%;" | U+069C 
| style="font-size:150%;" |  
| style="font-size:150%;" |  
| 3 dots 
| 3 dots 
| style="font-size:150%;" |  
| style="font-size:150%;" |  
|- 
| style="font-size:150%;" |  
| colspan=3 class="nowrap" style="font-size:140%;" |  
| style="text-align:left;font-size:95%;" | Ga, used to represent the voiced velar plosive  in Algerian and Tunisian.
| style="font-size:85%;" | U+06A8 
| colspan=2 style="font-size:150%;" |  
| 3 dots 
| style=color:#E2E5EA; | none 
| style="font-size:150%;" |  
| style="font-size:150%;" |  
|- 
| style="font-size:150%;" |  
| colspan=3 class="nowrap" style="font-size:140%;" |  
| style="text-align:left;font-size:95%;" | Gaf, represents a voiced velar plosive  in Persian, Pashto, Punjabi, Kyrgyz, Kazakh, Kurdish, Uyghur, Mesopotamian, Urdu and Ottoman Turkish.
| style="font-size:85%;" | U+06AF 
| colspan=2 | line
| horizontal line
| style=color:#E2E5EA; | none 
| style="font-size:150%;" |  
| style="font-size:150%;" |  
|- 
| style="font-size:150%;" |  
| colspan=3 class="nowrap" style="font-size:140%;" |  
| style="text-align:left;font-size:95%;" | Gaf, used to represent the phoneme  in Pashto.
| style="font-size:85%;" | U+06AB 
| colspan=2 style="font-size:150%;" |  
| ring
| style=color:#E2E5EA; | none 
| style="font-size:150%;" |  
| style="font-size:150%;" |  
|- 
| style="font-size:150%;" |  
| colspan=3 class="nowrap" style="font-size:140%;" |  
| rowspan=2 style="text-align:left;font-size:95%;" | Gaf, represents a voiced velar plosive  in the Jawi script of Malay.
| style="font-size:85%;" | U+0762 
| colspan=2 style="font-size:150%;" |  
| 1 dot 
| style=color:#E2E5EA; | none 
| style="font-size:150%;" |  
| style="font-size:150%;" |  
|- 
| style="font-size:150%;" |  
| colspan=3 class="nowrap" style="font-size:140%;" |  
| style="font-size:85%;" | U+06AC 
| colspan=2 style="font-size:150%;" | 
| 1 dot 
| style=color:#E2E5EA; | none 
| style="font-size:150%;" |  
| style="font-size:150%;" |  
|- 
| style="font-size:150%;" | 
| colspan=3 class="nowrap" style="font-size:140%;" | 
| style="text-align:left;font-size:95%;" | Gaf, represents a voiced velar plosive  in the Pegon script of Indonesian.
| style="font-size:85%;" | U+08B4 
| colspan=2 style="font-size:150%;" |  
| style=color:#E2E5EA; | none 
| 1 dot 
| style="font-size:150%;" |  
| style="font-size:150%;" |  
|- 
| style="font-size:150%;" |  
| colspan=3 class="nowrap" style="font-size:140%;" |  
| style="font-size:85%;" | U+06AD 
| colspan=2 style="font-size:150%;" |  
| 3 dots
| style=color:#E2E5EA; | none 
| style="font-size:150%;" |  
| style="font-size:150%;" |  
|- 
| style="font-size:150%;" |  
| colspan=3 class="nowrap" style="font-size:140%;" |  
| style="text-align:left;font-size:95%;" | Ee, used to represent the phoneme  in Somali.
| style="font-size:85%;" | U+0623 U+064A 
| style="font-size:150%;" |  
| style="font-size:150%;" |  
| Hamza 
| 2 dots 
| style="font-size:150%;" |  
| class="nowrap" |  +  
|- 
| style="font-size:150%;" |  
| colspan=3 class="nowrap" style="font-size:140%;" | 
| style="text-align:left;font-size:95%;" | E, used to represent the phoneme  in Somali.
| style="font-size:85%;" | U+0626 
| colspan=2 style="font-size:150%;" |  
| Hamza 
| style=color:#E2E5EA; | none 
| style="font-size:150%;" |  
| class="nowrap" style="font-size:150%;" |  
|- 
| style="font-size:150%;" |  
| colspan=3 class="nowrap" style="font-size:140%;" |  
| style="text-align:left;font-size:95%;" | Ii, used to represent the phoneme  in Somali and Saraiki.
| style="font-size:85%;" | U+0649 U+0653 
| colspan=2 style="font-size:150%;" | 
| Madda 
| style=color:#E2E5EA; | none 
| style="font-size:150%;" |  
| style="font-size:150%;" |  
|- 
| style="font-size:150%;" |  
| colspan=3 class="nowrap" style="font-size:140%;" |  
| style="text-align:left;font-size:95%;" | O, used to represent the phoneme  in Somali.
| style="font-size:85%;" | U+0624 
| colspan=2 style="font-size:150%;" |  
| Hamza 
| style=color:#E2E5EA; | none 
| style="font-size:150%;" |  
| style="font-size:150%;" |  
|-
|style="font-size:150%;" |  
| colspan=3 class="nowrap" style="font-size:140%;" |  
| style="text-align:left;font-size:95%;" | Ö, used to represent the phoneme  in Kyrgyz.
| style="font-size:85%;" | U+0624 
| colspan=2 style="font-size:150%;" |  
| Strikethrough
| style=color:#E2E5EA; | none 
| style="font-size:150%;" |  
| style="font-size:150%;" | 
|- 
| style="font-size:150%;" | 
| colspan=3 class="nowrap" style="font-size:140%;" |  
| style="text-align:left;font-size:95%;" | Pasta Ye, used to represent the phoneme  in Pashto and Uyghur.
| style="font-size:85%;" | U+06D0 
| colspan=2 style="font-size:150%;" |  
| style=color:#E2E5EA; | none 
| 2 dots vertical 
| style="font-size:150%;" |  
| style="font-size:150%;" |  
|- 
| style="font-size:150%;" | 
| colspan=3 class="nowrap" style="font-size:140%;" |  
| style="text-align:left;font-size:95%;" | Nārīna Ye, used to represent the phoneme [ɑj] and phoneme  in Pashto.
| style="font-size:85%;" | U+06CC 
| colspan=2 style="font-size:150%;" |  
|  2 dots  (start + mid)
| style=color:#E2E5EA; | none 
| style="font-size:150%;" |  
| style="font-size:150%;" |  
|- 
| style="font-size:150%;" | 
| colspan=1 class="nowrap" style="font-size:140%;" |  
| colspan=2 class="nowrap" style="font-size:85%;" | end  only 
| style="text-align:left;font-size:95%;" | X̌əźīna ye Ye, used to represent the phoneme [əi] in Pashto.  
| style="font-size:85%;" | U+06CD 
| colspan=2 | line 
| horizontal  line 
| style=color:#E2E5EA; | none 
| style="font-size:150%;" |  
| style="font-size:150%;" |  
|- 
| style="font-size:150%;" | 
| colspan=3 class="nowrap" style="font-size:140%;" |  
| style="font-size:85%;" | U+0626 
| colspan=2 style="font-size:150%;" |  
| Hamza 
| style=color:#E2E5EA; | none 
| style="font-size:150%;" |  
| style="font-size:150%;" |  
|- 
| style="font-size:150%;" |  
| colspan=3 class="nowrap" style="font-size:140%;" | 
| style="text-align:left;font-size:95%;" | Oo, used to represent the phoneme  in Somali.
| style="font-size:85%;" | U+0623 U+0648 
| colspan=2 style="font-size:150%;" |  
| Hamza 
| style=color:#E2E5EA; | none 
| style="font-size:150%;" |  
|  + 
|- 
| style="font-size:150%;" |  
| colspan=3 class="nowrap" style="font-size:140%;" |  
| style="text-align:left;font-size:95%;" | Uu, used to represent the phoneme  in Somali.
| style="font-size:85%;" |  +  U+0648 U+0653 
| colspan=2 style="font-size:150%;" |  
| Madda 
| style=color:#E2E5EA; | none 
| style="font-size:150%;" |  
|  + 
|- 
| style="font-size:150%;" | 
| colspan=3 class="nowrap" style="font-size:140%;" |  
| style="text-align:left;font-size:95%;" | represents a voiced velar implosive  in Sindhi and Saraiki
| style="font-size:85%;" | U+06B1 
| colspan=2 style="font-size:150%;" |  
| horizontal  line 
| 2 dots 
| style="font-size:150%;" | 
| style="font-size:150%;" |  
|- 
| style="font-size:150%;" | 
| colspan=3 class="nowrap" style="font-size:140%;" |  
| style="text-align:left;font-size:95%;" | represents the Velar nasal  phoneme in Sindhi.
| style="font-size:85%;" | U+06B1 
| colspan=2 style="font-size:150%;" |  
| 2 dots + horizontal  line
| style=color:#E2E5EA; | none 
| style="font-size:150%;" |  
| style="font-size:150%;" |  
|- 
| style="font-size:150%;" | 
| colspan=3 class="nowrap" style="font-size:140%;" |  
| style="text-align:left;font-size:95%;" | Khē, represents  in Sindhi.
| style="font-size:85%;" | U+06A9 
| colspan=2 | none 
| style=color:#E2E5EA; | none 
| style=color:#E2E5EA; | none 
| style="font-size:150%;" |  
| style="font-size:150%;" |  
|- 
| style="font-size:150%;" | 
| colspan=3 style="font-size:120%;" |  
| style="font-size:85%;" | U+06AA 
| colspan=2 | none 
| style=color:#E2E5EA; | none 
| style=color:#E2E5EA; | none 
| style="font-size:150%;" |  
|  or 
|- 
| style="font-size:150%;" |  
| colspan=3 class="nowrap" style="font-size:140%;" |  
| style="text-align:left;font-size:95%;" | used to represent the phoneme  (pinyin ng) in Chinese. 
| style="font-size:85%;" | U+0763 
| colspan=2 style="font-size:150%;" |  
| style=color:#E2E5EA; | none 
| 3 dots 
| style="font-size:150%;" |  
| style="font-size:150%;" |  
|- 
| style="font-size:150%;" |  
| colspan=3 class="nowrap" style="font-size:140%;" |  
| style="text-align:left;font-size:95%;" | represents the retroflex nasal  phoneme in Pashto. 
| style="font-size:85%;" | U+06BC 
| style="font-size:150%;" |  
| style="font-size:150%;" | 
| style="font-size:150%;" |  
| 1 dot 
| ring 
| style="font-size:150%;" |  
|- 
| style="font-size:150%;" |  
| colspan=3 class="nowrap" style="font-size:140%;" |  
| style="text-align:left;font-size:95%;" | represents the retroflex nasal  phoneme in Sindhi. 
| style="font-size:85%;" | U+06BB 
| colspan=2 style="font-size:150%;" |  
| small 
| style=color:#E2E5EA; | none 
| style="font-size:150%;" |  
| style="font-size:150%;" |  
|- 
| style="font-size:150%;" |  
| colspan=3 class="nowrap" style="font-size:140%;" |  
| style="text-align:left;font-size:95%;" | used in Punjabi to represent  and Saraiki to represent .
| style="font-size:85%;" | U+0768 
| style="font-size:150%;" |  
| style="font-size:150%;" |  
| 1 dot + small  
| style=color:#E2E5EA; | none 
| style="font-size:150%;" |  
| style="font-size:150%;" |  
|- 
| style="font-size:150%;" | 
| colspan=3 class="nowrap" style="font-size:140%;" |  
| style="text-align:left;font-size:95%;" | Nya  in the Jawi script.
| style="font-size:85%;" | U+06BD 
| colspan=2 style="font-size:150%;" |  
| 3 dots 
| style=color:#E2E5EA; | none 
| style="font-size:150%;" |  
| style="font-size:150%;" |  
|- 
| style="font-size:150%;" | 
| colspan=3 class="nowrap" style="font-size:140%;" |  
| style="text-align:left;font-size:95%;" | Nya  in the Pegon script.
| style="font-size:85%;" | U+06D1 
| colspan=2 style="font-size:150%;" |  
| style=color:#E2E5EA; | none 
| 3 dots 
| style="font-size:150%;" | 
| style="font-size:150%;" | 
|- 
| style="font-size:150%;" |  
| colspan=3 class="nowrap" style="font-size:140%;" |  
| style="text-align:left;font-size:95%;" | Nga  in the Jawi script and Pegon script.
| style="font-size:85%;" | U+06A0 
| colspan=2 style="font-size:150%;" |  
| 3 dots 
| style=color:#E2E5EA; | none 
| style="font-size:150%;" |  
| style="font-size:150%;" |  
|- 
| style="font-size:150%;" |  
| colspan=3 class="nowrap" style="font-size:140%;" |  
| style="text-align:left;font-size:95%;" | used in Marwari to represent a retroflex lateral flap , and in Kalami to represent a voiceless lateral fricative .
| style="font-size:85%;" | U+076A 
| colspan=2 | line 
| horizontal  line 
| style=color:#E2E5EA; | none 
| style="font-size:150%;" |  
| style="font-size:150%;" |  
|- 
| style="font-size:100%;" | 
| colspan=3 style="font-size:100%;" |  
| rowspan=2 style="text-align:left;font-size:95%;" |  - or alternately typeset as  - is used in Punjabi to represent voiced retroflex lateral approximant /ɭ/ 
| style="font-size:85%;" | U+08C7 
| rowspan=2 colspan=2 style="font-size:150%;" |  
| rowspan=2 | small  
| rowspan=2 style=color:#E2E5EA; | none
| rowspan=2 style="font-size:150%;" |  
| rowspan=2 style="font-size:150%;" |  
|- 
| style="font-size:150%;" | 
| colspan=3 style="font-size:120%;" | 
| style="font-size:85%;" | U+0644 U+0615
|- 
| style="font-size:150%;" |  
| colspan=3 class="nowrap" style="font-size:140%;" |  
| style="text-align:left;font-size:95%;" | Vi, used in Algerian Arabic and Tunisian Arabic when written in Arabic script to represent the sound  (unofficial).
| style="font-size:85%;" | U+06A5 
| colspan=2 style="font-size:150%;" |  
| style=color:#E2E5EA; | none 
| 3 dots 
| style="font-size:150%;" |  
| style="font-size:150%;" |  
|- 
| style="font-size:150%;" |  
| colspan=3 class="nowrap" style="font-size:140%;" |  
| style="text-align:left;font-size:95%;" | Ve, used in by some Arabic speakers to represent the phoneme /v/ in loanwords, and in the Kurdish language when written in Arabic script to represent the sound . Also used as pa   in the Jawi script and Pegon script.
| style="font-size:85%;" | U+06A4 
| colspan=2 style="font-size:150%;" | 
| 3 dots 
| style=color:#E2E5EA; | none 
| style="font-size:150%;" |  
| style="font-size:150%;" |  
|- 
| style="font-size:150%;" |  
| colspan=3 class="nowrap" style="font-size:140%;" |  
| style="text-align:left;font-size:95%;" | Va in the Jawi script.
| style="font-size:85%;" | U+06CF 
| colspan=2 style="font-size:150%;" |  
| 1 dot 
| style=color:#E2E5EA; | none 
| style="font-size:150%;" |  
| style="font-size:150%;" |  
|- 
| style="font-size:150%;" | 
| colspan=3 class="nowrap" style="font-size:140%;" | 
| style="font-size:85%;" | U+06CB 
| colspan=2 style="font-size:150%;" |  
| 3 dots 
| style=color:#E2E5EA; | none 
| style="font-size:150%;" |  
| style="font-size:150%;" |  
|- 
| style="font-size:150%;" |  
| colspan=3 class="nowrap" style="font-size:140%;" |  
| style="text-align:left;font-size:95%;" | represents "O"  in Kurdish, and in Uyghur it represents the sound similar to the French eu and œu  sound. It represents the "у" close back rounded vowel  phoneme in Bosnian.
| style="font-size:85%;" | U+06C6 
| colspan=2 style="font-size:150%;" |  
| V pointing down 
| style=color:#E2E5EA; | none 
| style="font-size:150%;" |  
| style="font-size:150%;" |  
|- 
| style="font-size:150%;" |  
| colspan=3 class="nowrap" style="font-size:140%;" |  
| style="text-align:left;font-size:95%;" | U, used to represents the Close back rounded vowel  phoneme in Azerbaijani, Kazakh, Kyrgyz and Uyghur.
| style="font-size:85%;" | U+06C7 
| colspan=2 style="font-size:150%;" | 
| Damma
| style=color:#E2E5EA; | none 
| style="font-size:150%;" |  
| style="font-size:150%;" | 
|- 
| style="font-size:150%;" |  
| colspan=3 class="nowrap" style="font-size:140%;" |  
| style="text-align:left;font-size:95%;" | represents Ê or É  in Kurdish.
| style="font-size:85%;" | U+06CE 
| colspan=2 style="font-size:150%;" |  
| V pointing down 
|  2 dots  (start + mid) 
| style="font-size:150%;" |  
| style="font-size:150%;" |  
|- 
| style="font-size:130%;" |    
| colspan=3 style="font-size:130%;" |    
| style="text-align:left;font-size:95%;" | Do-chashmi he (two-eyed hāʼ), used in digraphs for aspiration  and breathy voice  in Punjabi and Urdu. Also used to represent  in Kazakh, Sorani and Uyghur. 
| style="font-size:85%;" | U+06BE 
| colspan=2 | none 
| style=color:#E2E5EA; | none 
| style=color:#E2E5EA; | none 
| style="font-size:150%;" |  
| style="font-size:150%;" |  
|- 
| style="font-size:130%;" | 
| colspan=3 style="font-size:130%;" |  
| style="font-size:85%;" | U+06D5 
| colspan=2 | none 
| style=color:#E2E5EA; | none 
| style=color:#E2E5EA; | none 
| style="font-size:150%;" |  
| style="font-size:150%;" | 
|-
| style="font-size:150%;" |  
| colspan=1 class="nowrap" style="font-size:140%;" |  
| colspan=2 style="font-size:85%;" | end  only 
| style="text-align:left;font-size:95%;" | Baṛī ye ('big yāʼ), is a stylistic variant of ي in Arabic, but represents "ai" or "e" ,  in Urdu and Punjabi.
| style="font-size:85%;" | U+06D2 
| colspan=2 | none 
| style=color:#E2E5EA; | none 
| style=color:#E2E5EA; | none 
| style="font-size:150%;" |  
| style="font-size:150%;" |  
|- 
| style="font-size:150%;" |  
| colspan=3 class="nowrap" style="font-size:140%;" |  
| style="text-align:left;font-size:95%;" | used to represent the phoneme  (pinyin c) in Chinese.
| style="font-size:85%;" | U+069E 
| colspan=2 style="font-size:150%;" |  
| 3 dots 
| style=color:#E2E5EA; | none 
| style="font-size:150%;" |  
| style="font-size:150%;" |  
|- 
| style="font-size:150%;" | 
| colspan=3 class="nowrap" style="font-size:140%;" |  
| style="text-align:left;font-size:95%;" | used to represent the phoneme  (pinyin z) in Chinese.
| style="font-size:85%;" | U+0637 
| style="font-size:150%;" | 
| style="font-size:150%;" | 
| 
| 
| style="font-size:150%;" |  
| style="font-size:150%;" |  
|- 
| style="font-size:150%;" |  
| colspan=3 class="nowrap" style="font-size:140%;" |  
| style="text-align:left;font-size:95%;" | represents the "o" open-mid back rounded vowel  phoneme in Bosnian.
| style="font-size:85%;" | U+06C9 
| colspan=2 style="font-size:150%;" |  
| V pointing up 
| style=color:#E2E5EA; | none 
| style="font-size:150%;" |  
| style="font-size:150%;" | 
|- 
| style="font-size:150%;" |  
| colspan=3 class="nowrap" style="font-size:140%;" |  
| style="text-align:left;font-size:95%;" | represents the "nj" palatal nasal  phoneme in Bosnian.
| style="font-size:85%;" | U+0769 
| style="font-size:150%;" | 
| style="font-size:150%;" |  
| 1 dot  V pointing down 
| style=color:#E2E5EA; | none 
| style="font-size:150%;" |  
| style="font-size:150%;" |  
|- 
| style="font-size:150%;" | 
| colspan=3 class="nowrap" style="font-size:140%;" |  
| style="text-align:left;font-size:95%;" | used in Kurdish to represent ll  in Soranî dialect.
| style="font-size:85%;" | U+06B5 
| colspan=2 style="font-size:150%;" |  
| V pointing down 
| style=color:#E2E5EA; | none 
| style="font-size:150%;" |  
| style="font-size:150%;" |  
|- 
| style="font-size:150%;" |  
| colspan=3 class="nowrap" style="font-size:140%;" |  
| style="text-align:left;font-size:95%;" | represents the "lj" palatal lateral approximant  phoneme in Bosnian.
| style="font-size:85%;" | U+06B5 
| colspan=2 style="font-size:150%;" |  
| V pointing down 
| style=color:#E2E5EA; | none
| style="font-size:150%;" |  
| style="font-size:150%;" |  
|- 
| style="font-size:150%;" |  
| colspan=3 class="nowrap" style="font-size:140%;" |  
| style="text-align:left;font-size:95%;" | represents the "i" close front unrounded vowel  phoneme in Bosnian.
| style="font-size:85%;" | U+0627 U+0656 U+0649 
| colspan=2 style="font-size:150%;" |  
| Alef 
| style=color:#E2E5EA; | none
| style="font-size:150%;" |  
|  + 
|- 
|} 
 Footnotes:''' 

 Letter construction 
Most languages that use alphabets based on the Arabic alphabet use the same base shapes. Most additional letters in languages that use alphabets based on the Arabic alphabet are built by adding (or removing) diacritics to existing Arabic letters. Some stylistic variants in Arabic have distinct meanings in other languages. For example, variant forms of kāf  are used in some languages and sometimes have specific usages. In Urdu and some neighbouring languages, the letter Hā has diverged into two forms  dō-čašmī hē and  gōl hē. While a variant form of  yā referred to as baṛī yē  is used at the end of some words.

 Table of Letter Components 

 See also 
 Arabic (Unicode block)
 Eastern Arabic numerals (digit shapes commonly used with Arabic script)
 History of the Arabic alphabet
 Transliteration of Arabic
 Xiao'erjing

References

External links

 Unicode collation charts—including Arabic letters, sorted by shape
 Why the right side of your brain doesn't like Arabic
 Arabic fonts by SIL's Non-Roman Script Initiative
  Alexis Neme and Sébastien Paumier (2019), "Restoring Arabic vowels through omission-tolerant dictionary lookup", Lang Resources & Evaluation'', Vol. 53, pp. 1–65. ; 

 
Arabic orthography
Right-to-left writing systems
Abjad writing systems